is a Japanese dish that consists of a breaded, deep-fried pork cutlet. It involves coating slices of pork with panko (bread crumbs), and then frying them in oil. The two main types are fillet and loin. Tonkatsu is also the basis of other dishes such as katsukarē and katsudon.

Etymology 
The word tonkatsu is a combination of the Sino-Japanese word ton meaning "pig", and katsu, which is a shortened form of katsuretsu, an old transliteration of the English word cutlet.

History 
Tonkatsu originated in Japan during the Meiji Era in the late 19th century, a dish derived from European-style breaded and fried meat cutlets. European katsuretsu (loanword/gairaigo for cutlet) was usually made with beef; the pork version was created in 1899 at a restaurant serving European-style foods, named Rengatei in Tokyo, Japan. It's a type of yōshoku — Japanese versions of European cuisine invented in the late 19th and early 20th centuries — and was called katsuretsu or simply katsu.

Preparation and serving 

Tonkatsu is then sliced into bits and served, commonly with shredded cabbage. It is most commonly eaten with a type of thick brown sauce called tonkatsu sauce or simply sōsu (sauce), karashi (mustard), and perhaps a slice of lemon. It is usually served with rice, miso soup and tsukemono and eaten with chopsticks. It may also be served with ponzu and grated daikon instead of tonkatsu sauce.

Variations 

In Nagoya and surrounding areas, miso katsu, tonkatsu eaten with a hatchō miso-based sauce, is a speciality.

Variations on tonkatsu may be made by sandwiching an ingredient such as cheese or shiso leaf between the meat, and then breading and frying.  For the calorie conscious, konnyaku is sometimes sandwiched in the meat.

Several variations of tonkatsu use alternatives to pork:

 Chicken katsu or Tori katsu, which uses chicken instead, often appears in Hawaiian plate lunches.
 Menchi-katsu or minchi katsu ( mince katsu), is a minced meat patty, breaded and deep fried.
 Hamu katsu ( ham katsu), a similar dish made from ham, is usually considered a budget alternative to tonkatsu.
 Gyū katsu ( beef katsu), also known as bīfu katsu, is popular in the Kansai region around Osaka and Kobe.

In general, breaded and deep-fried foods are called furai (frys). Furai of mammal or bird meats, such as pork, beef, or chicken are called katsu (cutlet). Furai of ingredients other than that are just called furai, such as aji-furai (fried horse mackerel) and ebi-furai (fried prawn).

Tonkatsu and other furais are never called tempura. Tempura is not breaded, and is not seen as a kind of furai.

Tonkatsu is also popular as a sandwich filling (katsu sando), or served on Japanese curry to become katsukarē. Tonkatsu is sometimes simmered with egg and broth, then served on a big bowl of rice as katsudon. There is also katsu rice, which is pork cutlet on rice topped with demi-glace sauce.

See also 
 Japanese cuisine
 List of Japanese dishes#Deep-fried dishes (agemono, 揚げ物), a category of deep-fried dishes in Japanese cuisine
 List of pork dishes
 Schnitzel

References

External links 

Breaded cutlets
Deep fried foods
Japanese fusion cuisine
Japanese pork dishes
Sandwiches
Fried pork